Edmund Ward may refer to:
Edmund Franklin Ward (1892–1990), American illustrator
Edmund Ward (architect) (1912–1998), British architect, co-founder of GMW Architects
Edmund Ward (screenwriter) (1928–1993), British novelist and screenwriter
Ed Ward (writer) (1948–2021), American writer and radio commentator 
Edmund Ward Ltd, British publishers

See also
Ed Ward (disambiguation)